The lateral cord is the part of the brachial plexus formed by the anterior divisions of the upper (C5-C6) and middle trunks (C7). Its name comes from it being lateral to the axillary artery as it passes through the axilla. The other cords of the brachial plexus are the posterior cord and medial cord.

The lateral cord gives rise to the following nerves from proximal to distal:

lateral pectoral nerve (C5-C7)
musculocutaneous nerve (C5-C7)
lateral head of median nerve (C5-C7) [other part of median nerve comes from medial cord]

Additional images

Nerves of the upper limb